is the second live-action film adaptation of novel of the same name. The film was released in Japan on November 8, 1997, directed by Haruki Kadokawa, with a screenplay by Ryōji Itō, Chiho Katsura and Haruki Kadokawa, starring beginner Nana Nakamoto in the main role. The film is narrated by the previous 1983 film's lead-actress Tomoyo Harada, and is set in 1965, when the novel was published for the first time. The film poster was used as the new cover for the 1997 edition of the novel.

Cast
 Nana Nakamoto as Kazuko Yoshiyama
 Shunsuke Nakamura as Kazuo Fukamachi
 Mitsuko Baisho
 Takaaki Enoki
 Mariko Hamatani (:ja:浜谷真理子)
 Yu Hayami
 Masatō Ibu
 Yoshiko Kuga
 Hironobu Nomura
 Tsunehiko Watase
 Itsumi Yamamura

Theme songs
"Yume no Naka de ~We are not alone, forever~" and "Toki no Canzone", a remake of the 1983 film's theme song, written and sung by Yumi Matsutoya.

References

External links
 

1997 films
Japanese science fiction films
Films about time travel
The Girl Who Leapt Through Time
1990s science fiction films
Films set in 1965
1990s Japanese films